Tarık "Taro" Emir Tekin (born 15 June 1997) is a Turkish actor, known for his roles in the TV series Sadakatsiz and . He studied drama at the Oxford School of Drama.Tekin is the son of actress Şevval Sam and retired footballer Metin Tekin. His grandmother is singer Leman Sam.

Life and career
Tarık "Taro" Emir Tekin was born on 15 June 1997 in Istanbul to actress Şevval Sam and footballer Metin Tekin. After showing an interest in acting at an early age, Tekin attended the Cambridge School of Visual & Performing Arts and continued his studies at University of the Arts London. He then took courses in acting at the Royal Academy of Dramatic Art and studied at the Oxford School of Drama. After living in England for a period of time, he returned to Turkey where he started his acting career. He made his acting debut in 2020 with a role on Netflix's historical docudrama Rise of Empires: Ottoman and later appeared on 's streaming series  as Bulut. In the same year he rose to prominence after appeaing on Kanal D's series Sadakatsiz, in which he portrayed the character of Selçuk Dağcı. In 2022, he appeared in a leading role in the series , playing the role of Onur Köksal.

Besides acting, Tekin is also interested in music as an amateur.

Filmography

Awards

References

External links 
 
 
 

1997 births
Living people
21st-century Turkish male actors
Alumni of the Oxford School of Drama
Golden Butterfly Award winners
Male actors from Istanbul
Turkish male television actors
Turkish male film actors